Head of a Tyrant or Judith and Holofernes (Italian:Giuditta e Oloferne) is a 1959 Italian-French historical film directed by Fernando Cerchio and starring Massimo Girotti, Isabelle Corey and Renato Baldini.

It is part of the boom in Sword-and-sandal productions during the late 1950s. The film is based on the story of Judith Beheading Holofernes. A 1929 film Judith and Holofernes was also inspired by the tale.

Cast
 Massimo Girotti as Holophernes  
 Isabelle Corey as Judith  
 Renato Baldini as Arbar  
 Yvette Masson as Rispa  
 Gianni Rizzo as Ozia  
 Camillo Pilotto as Belial 
 Lucia Banti as Servant Girl 
 Ricardo Valle as Isaac  
 Leonardo Botta as Gabriele  
 Franco Balducci as Galaad  
 Luigi Tosi as Irasa 
 Gabriele Antonini as Brother 
 Daniela Rocca as Naomi  
 Enzo Doria as Daniel

See also
 Judith of Bethulia (1914)

References

Bibliography
 Parish, James Robert. Film Directors Guide:Western Europe. Scarecrow Press, 1976.

External links

Head of a Tyrant at Variety Distribution

1959 films
French historical drama films
Judith in film
Italian historical drama films
1950s historical drama films
1950s Italian-language films
French films based on plays
Peplum films
Films about Jews and Judaism
Films based on the Hebrew Bible
Films scored by Carlo Savina
Religious epic films
Sword and sandal films
1959 drama films
1950s Italian films
1950s French films